Kathrin Julia Hendrich (born 6 April 1992) is a German-Belgian footballer who plays for VfL Wolfsburg and the German national team. A versatile defender, she can play well as a centre-back, a full-back or a sweeper.

International career
Hendrich was born in Belgium to a German father and a Belgian mother. She has represented the Germany women's national football team since 2014.

Career statistics

International

International goals
Scores and results list Germany's goal tally first:

Honours
1. FFC Frankfurt
UEFA Women's Champions League: 2014–15
Germany

 UEFA Women's Championship runner-up: 2022
 Algarve Cup: 2014
Germany U19
UEFA Women's Under-19 Championship: 2011
Germany U20
FIFA U-20 Women's World Cup: runners-up 2012

References

External links
Profile at the German Football Federation

1992 births
Living people
People from Eupen
German women's footballers
Germany women's international footballers
Belgian women's footballers
German people of Belgian descent
Belgian people of German descent
1. FFC Frankfurt players
Bayer 04 Leverkusen (women) players
FC Bayern Munich (women) players
Frauen-Bundesliga players
Women's association football defenders
2019 FIFA Women's World Cup players
Footballers from Liège Province
UEFA Women's Euro 2022 players
VfL Wolfsburg (women) players
UEFA Women's Euro 2017 players